Sown In Weakness, Raised In Power, also referred to as Sown In Weakness is the debut and only full-length album of the Christian metallic hardcore band, Mindrage. It is the last release to feature Society's Finest drummer, Chad Wilburn.

Critical reception

Word Press writes:"Anyway, this being a review of Mindrage’s Sown In Weakness, Raised In Power disc, let me make one thing perfectly clear- while this little band may have sprung from former members of the (*sigh*) metalcore band Living Sacrifice (don’t get me started...), Mindrage’s sound has more to do with Prong, later-day Sepultura, and Pantera than true metalcore bands. This has a distinctive metal groove that crushes, with a light yet very distinctive Hardcore attitude that smashes. The vocals remind me much of Prong in their Cleansing days, really. While there’s a couple of instances where the comparison to Living Sacrifice is evident (like the acoustic intro to opener “Not Alone”, and “Asphyxiate”, which sounds like it had its origins in the Reborn sessions), they’re few and far between. Overall, a very nice, heavy, groove-laden piece of metal for ye’all..." John Sant of "Exit Zine.com" writes:"The album definitely has its moments, but not nearly enough of them. They'll play with an awesome riff but then never really follow it up, forgetting it and going back to whatever chugga-chugga riff they were doing before. All in all, I do enjoy this album. I don't regret the purchase, but I can think of a couple other CDs I would have rather bought in place of this. "

Track listing

Credits
Mindrage
 John LeCompt - Vocals, guitar
 Nick Williams - Bass
 Chad Wilburn - Drums

Production
 Marty Bush - Executive Producer
 Jason Magnusson - Assistant
 Rodney Mills - Mastering

References

External links
 

1999 debut albums
Mindrage albums